He's Mine may refer to:
He's Mine (MoKenStef song)
He's Mine (Billy Ray Cyrus song), also recorded by Rodney Atkins